Nidularium purpureum is a bromeliad in the genus Nidularium. This species is endemic to Brazil.

References

purpureum
Flora of Brazil